The World Fair Trade Organization (WFTO) is the global community and verifier of enterprises that fully practice Fair Trade. It is an association of SMEs, farmers or retailers that fully practice the 10 Principles of Fair Trade. They also advocate for fundamental change in our current economic system.
 Members are primarily fair trade enterprises, whose business model is verified by independent audit and peer review. Verification is at enterprise level, which covers all aspects of the business and supply chain. WFTO verification should not be confused with commodity certification systems, such as Fairtrade certification, where only a component of the product is covered. The WFTO product label can only be used by verified fair trade enterprises, which consist of producer cooperatives and associations, export marketing companies, importers, retailers, national and regional fair trade networks and Fair Trade Support Organizations. WFTO is democratically run on a one member one vote basis. WFTO was created in 1989 and was formerly the International Federation of Alternative Traders ("IFAT").

WFTO members use commercial activity to achieve a social mission and have been referred to as 'Fair Trade Social Enterprises'.

WFTO's stated mission is "to enable producers to improve their livelihoods and communities through Fair Trade". Their five goals are:

To be the leading network of the Fair Trade movement
To provide an environment for sharing and learning
To raise awareness of and promote the Fair Trade model, and advocate for change to conventional trade.
To create market access opportunities for members
To enhance WFTO's capability to deliver a broader range of services to its members

In 2017 the WFTO board appointed Erinch Sahan as Chief Executive.

WFTO verification and logo
In 2004 WFTO launched verification scheme and mark. The FTO Mark identifies registered Fair Trade Organizations worldwide (as opposed to products in the case of FLO International and Fairtrade mark) and guarantees that standards are being implemented regarding working conditions, wages, child labor and the environment. These standards are verified by self-assessment, mutual reviews and external verification. The FTO Mark is available to all WFTO members who meet the requirements of the WFTO Standards and Monitoring System and so far over 150 organizations have registered.

The WFTO logo is for organizations that demonstrate a 100% commitment to Fair Trade in all their business activities. Only monitored WFTO members are authorized to use the logo.
The Fair Trade Organization Mark (WFTO Logo) shows that an organization follows the WFTO's 10 Principles of Fair Trade, covering working conditions, transparency, wages, the environment, gender equity and more.

The WFTO logo is not a product mark - it is used to brand organisations that are committed to 100% Fair Trade. It sets them apart from commercial as well as other Fair Trade businesses, and provides a clear signal to retailers, partners, governments and donors that their core activity is Fair Trade.

The system was originally designed for marginalised producers currently not catered for by the Fairtrade Certification system, which was designed for commodity products. Due to the variety and complexity of handcrafts, for example, a product standard is technically difficult to apply. The system, then, provides an alternative that will verify that an organisation practices Fair Trade in all its activities. Once certified, the organisation will be able to use the label on all its products.

Fair Trade is a type of partnership based on communication and reverence that ensures fairness in international trade. Since the seventies, there have been several groups and conferences held that discussed the implementation of regulations regarding trade. However, The World Fair Trade Organization (WFTO) was not established until the early nineties. The WFTO has several hundred partnerships across the globe with established practices and procedures meant to protect the groups and individuals associated with Fair Trade.

10 principles of Fair Trade
WFTO prescribes 10 Principles that Fair Trade Organizations must follow in their day-to-day work and carries out monitoring to ensure these principles are upheld:

 Creating Opportunities for Economically Disadvantaged Producers
 Transparency and Accountability
 Fair Trading Practices
 Payment of a Fair Price
 Ensuring no Child Labor and Forced Labor
 Commitment to Non Discrimination, Gender Equity and Freedom of Association
 Ensuring Good Working Conditions
 Providing Capacity Building
 Promoting Fair Trade
 Respect for the Environment

Regional representative bodies
The WFTO operates in five key regions: Africa, Asia, Latin America, Europe and North America & Pacific Rim.
Members in Africa, Asia, Europe and Latin America have come together to form WFTO regional chapters.

Africa: COFTA
The Cooperation for Fair Trade in Africa - COFTA is the network of Fair Trade producer organisations operating in Africa and working with disadvantaged small-scale producers.

Asia: WFTO-Asia
The Asian chapter of WFTO operates in 20 countries and comprises over 140 fair trade organizations. Member nations include: Bangladesh, China, Cambodia, Georgia, India, Indonesia, Japan, South Korea, Laos, Malaysia, Nepal, Pakistan, Philippines, Sri Lanka, Thailand and Vietnam. Their roles in the fair trade operations vary, and included are: producers, cooperatives, retailers, NGO's, and faith-based organizations, amongst others.

Europe: WFTO-EUROPE
WFTO-Europe, formerly known as IFAT Europe (International Federation for Alternative Trade), is formed by 84 members, amongst them Fair Trade organizations, Fair Trade networks and support organizations. It represents the European chapter of the World Fair Trade Organization.

In 2009, the Network of European Worldshops (NEWS) was integrated into WFTO-Europe.

Latin America: WFTO-LA
WFTO-LA is currently composed of 55 members from 13 countries of Latin America. The Regional Office is located in Areguá, Paraguay.

The Pacific-Rim: WFTO-PACIFIC
WFTO-PacificRim is currently composed of 23 members from 5 countries around the Pacific - New Zealand, Australia, Japan, Canada, and USA. The Regional Office is located in Irvine, near Los Angeles, California, USA.

References

External links
World Fair Trade Organization
World Fair Trade Organization – Asian Chapter
WFTO-LA – Associacion Latino Americana de Commercio Justo (WFTO Latin America)
WFTO-Europe – World Fair Trade Organization-Europe (WFTO-Europe)

Fair trade organizations
Organisations based in Gelderland
Organizations established in 1989